Steve Duquette is an American cartoonist who has worked on several advertising campaigns.

Information
He received the National Cartoonist Society Commercial Award in 1990.

External links
 NCS Awards
 Steve Duquette's biography at the NCS site 

American cartoonists
Living people
Year of birth missing (living people)
Place of birth missing (living people)